Morgan de toi is a clothing brand, owned by the French company Morgan SA. The company was established in 1947 to sell lingerie, but has since diversified.

At present it has over 650 retail outlets worldwide.  Production is vertically integrated and takes place mainly in France.  The brand is targeted at women between the ages of 18 and 35. The CEO is Yann Jaslet and the headquarters are in Paris.

Morgan operates worldwide in the following arenas:
 retail stores,
 licensed stores,
 wholesale,
 mail order,
 3rd party internet

The UK operation had moved to 7 Back Hill, London (former site of the Van der Moolen Bonds offices), and appointed Fergus Patterson as their managing director. The business operated stand alone retail sites as well as numerous concessions in leading department stores such as Debenhams and House of Fraser.

In Friends' episode The One With Ross's Thing, Phoebe wears a Morgan t-shirt.

References

External links 
 

Clothing brands
Clothing companies of France
Clothing companies established in 1947
French companies established in 1947